Troublemaker is the debut album from former Small Faces and Faces keyboardist Ian McLagan, released in 1979 on Mercury Records.

Backed by a core group of Johnny Lee Schell (guitar and vocals), Paul Stallworth (bass) and Jim Keltner (drums), McLagan's rough-hewed voice and keyboards along with the party atmosphere permeating throughout the album - especially on the lead-off "La De Da" and Schell's donated "Little Troublemaker" - make the album a late part three to Ronnie Wood's albums I've Got My Own Album to Do (1974) and Now Look (1975), which had featured McLagan as core keyboardist. In the period Troublemaker   was recorded, McLagan toured with The New Barbarians, and the other members of that band - Wood, Keith Richards, Bobby Keys, Stanley Clarke and Zigaboo Modeliste - are all featured on the reggae number "Truly".

The album, combined with McLagan's 1985 extended play Last Chance to Dance and some bonus tracks, has been re-issued under the title Here Comes Trouble on the Maniac Records label.

Track listing
All tracks composed by Ian McLagan; except where indicated

 "La De Da" (2:25)
 "Headlines" (3:00)
 "Truly" (Carl Levy) (5:58)
 "Somebody" (2:58)
 "Movin' Out" (3:52)
 "Little Troublemaker" (Johnny Lee Schell) (2:26)
 "If It's Alright" (2:00)
 "Sign" (McLagan, Schell) (3:24)
 "Hold On" (3:43)
 "Mystifies Me" (Ron Wood) (5:25)

Personnel
Troublemakers
 Ian McLagan - vocals, Wurlitzer electric piano, Hammond B3 organ, acoustic and electric guitars 
 Johnny Lee Schell - electric and acoustic guitars, vocals
 Paul Stallworth - bass
 Jim Keltner - drums
with:
 Bobby Keys - tenor saxophone (3, 4, 5, 6, 10) 
 Ronnie Wood - guitar, tenor saxophone, vocals (3, 4)
 Keith Richards - guitar, vocals (3)
 Stanley Clarke - bass (3)
 Zigaboo Modeliste - drums (3)
 Steve Madaio - trumpet (4)
 Ringo Starr - drums (9)
 Geoff Workman - accordion (9)
 Jaime Segal - vocals (10)

Production
Producer: Geoff Workman
Engineer: Geoff Workman
Associate Engineer: John Weaver

The information above can be found in the CD booklets of "Here Comes Trouble" and "I've Got My Own Album to Do".

References

1979 debut albums
Ian McLagan albums
Mercury Records albums
Albums recorded at Shangri-La (recording studio)